Joshua LaRoy Barfield (born December 17, 1982) is a former American professional baseball second baseman. He is the son of former major league outfielder Jesse Barfield. Barfield was born in Venezuela during his mother's two-week winterball visit with his father. He attended Klein High School in Harris County, Texas and holds the District 5 single season home run record.

His younger brother Jeremy Barfield was drafted by the Oakland Athletics in the 8th round of 2008 Major League Baseball draft.

Professional career

San Diego Padres
Barfield was drafted in the fourth round of the 2001 Major League Baseball draft by the San Diego Padres. In , he fell to third in the organization behind pitcher Cesar Carrillo and catcher George Kottaras.
 
Barfield made his major league debut April 3, and collected his first career hit. His first major league home run came April 17, 2006, at Coors Field against the Colorado Rockies, a 431-foot solo shot to left-center field, off Jeff Francis.

On September 4, 2006, against the Rockies in Petco Park, Barfield hit a walk-off home run, a three-run home run off Brian Fuentes that gave the Padres a 7–5 victory. He claimed that he had not hit a walk-off home run at any level of baseball prior to that.

Cleveland Indians
On November 8, 2006, Barfield was traded to the Cleveland Indians for third baseman Kevin Kouzmanoff and pitcher Andrew Brown.

Barfield began the 2007 season as the Indians everyday second baseman, but in August, after poor hitting, lost the job to Asdrúbal Cabrera. He finished 2007 with a .243 batting average, 3 home runs, and 53 RBI.

Barfield was called up by Cleveland on June 9, 2008, to replace Cabrera, who was hitting a team low .184. At the time of his call-up, Barfield had an average of .255 with 5 homers and 21 RBI, respectively, for Buffalo. In his second game after being called up, he sprained a finger and was placed on the disabled list on June 12, 2008.

On August 11, 2009, Barfield was outrighted to Triple-A Columbus by the Indians and removed from their 40-man roster.

Second stint with Padres
On February 19, 2010, Barfield signed a minor league contract with the San Diego Padres with an invite to spring training.

Baltimore Orioles
On March 21, 2012, he signed a minor league contract with the Baltimore Orioles.

Post-playing career
Since 2019, Barfield has been the Diamondbacks farm director.

See also
 List of second-generation Major League Baseball players
 List of Major League Baseball players from Venezuela

References

External links

1982 births
Living people
African-American baseball players
Akron Aeros players
American expatriates in Venezuela
Arizona Diamondbacks scouts
Bowie Baysox players
Buffalo Bisons (minor league) players
Cleveland Indians players
Columbus Clippers players
Fort Wayne Wizards players
Idaho Falls Padres players
Lake Elsinore Storm players
Lehigh Valley IronPigs players
Long Island Ducks players
Major League Baseball players from Venezuela
Venezuelan expatriate baseball players in the United States
Major League Baseball second basemen
Mobile BayBears players
Norfolk Tides players
Sportspeople from Barquisimeto
People from Harris County, Texas
Peoria Javelinas players
Portland Beavers players
San Diego Padres players
Klein High School alumni
21st-century African-American sportspeople
20th-century African-American people